The Collection is a streaming television period drama series, focusing on the Paris fashion scene after World War II.

Plot
The series focuses on brothers Paul and Claude Sabine at their family's Paris fashion house. Around them, the city is emerging from the Occupation of World War II. The charming and outgoing Paul has the business savvy of the two brothers. Claude is the artistic talent, but also introverted, misanthropic and homosexual.

Paul seeks to stake a claim in the top tiers of the Paris fashion scene as the city poises itself to reclaim the title of fashion capital of the world. He encounters obstacles in the forms of his past, his conniving mother's actions and the competitive environment of the industry.

Paul's American wife, Helen, comes from a wealthy family whose money helped the Sabine fashion house survive during austere times. Throughout the first season, she and Paul face marital problems due to his many secrets.

Claude, meanwhile, grapples with the emotional trauma of a vicious attack and robbery by a lover who then suddenly disappeared. He also longs for more recognition of his artistic contributions to the Sabine house, but his efforts are often thwarted by his dominating family and his own anti-social behavior.

The series also follows Billy Novak, a young American photographer who is hired by the Sabine family. He is inspired by and falls in love with a seamstress-turned-model named Nina. She, however, is more concerned with finding the illegitimate son she was recently forced to give up for adoption.

The series includes the lives and relationships of other employees in the fashion house. It also addresses the atmosphere of uneasiness and paranoia that arose in the Cold War era, as well as the hunt for former Nazi collaborators.

Cast
 Richard Coyle as Paul Sabine
 Tom Riley as Claude Sabine
 Mamie Gummer as Helen Sabine
 Frances de la Tour as Yvette
 Jenna Thiam as Nina
 Max Deacon as Billy Novak
  as Charlotte
 Alexandre Brasseur as Victor
 Irène Jacob as Marianne
 Poppy Corby-Tuech as Dominique
 Bethan Mary James as Juliette
 Sarah Parish as Marjorie Stutter
 James Cosmo as Jules Trouvier
 Michael Kitchen as Lemaire
 Allan Corduner as Bompard
 Stanley Townsend as Stanley Rossi
 Michelle Gomez as Eliette
 Jacob Fortune-Lloyd as Cesar

Production
The eight-part series was filmed in Wales, France and Pinewood Studios in the first half of 2016 and marked the first time a continental-European public national broadcaster has collaborated with a major subscription video on demand platform, a global distributor and a British production company, on an English-language drama.

The creator, Oliver Goldstick, was previously an executive producer of the fashion drama series Ugly Betty.

Episodes

Broadcast
In Australia, the series premiered on BBC First on 14 March 2017. In South Korea, KBS 1TV started to air it on 30 June 2017. In Russia, the series premiered on Channel One Russia on 17 July 2017. In the United States, it began airing under the PBS Masterpiece umbrella on 8 October 2017.

References

External links

2016 British television series debuts
2016 British television series endings
2010s British drama television series
2010s French drama television series
English-language television shows
Amazon Prime Video original programming
Fashion-themed television series
Serial drama television series
Television series by Amazon Studios
Television series by BBC Studios